The mayor of Varese is an elected politician who, along with Varese's City Council, is accountable for the strategic government of Varese in Lombardy, Italy. 

The current mayor is Davide Galimberti (PD), who took office on 21 June 2016.

Overview
According to the Italian Constitution, the mayor of Varese is member of the city council.

The mayor is elected by the population of Varese, who also elects the members of the city council, controlling the mayor's policy guidelines and is able to enforce his resignation by a motion of no confidence. The mayor is entitled to appoint and release the members of his government.

Since 1997 the mayor is elected directly by Varese's electorate: in all mayoral elections in Italy in cities with a population higher than 15,000 the voters express a direct choice for the mayor or an indirect choice voting for the party of the candidate's coalition. If no candidate receives at least 50% of votes, the top two candidates go to a second round after two weeks. The election of the city council is based on a direct choice for the candidate with a preference vote: the candidate with the majority of the preferences is elected. The number of the seats for each party is determined proportionally.

Republic of Italy (since 1946)

City Council election (1946-1997)
From 1946 to 1997, the mayor of Varese was elected by the City Council.

Direct election (since 1997)
Since 1997, under provisions of new local administration law, the Mayor of Varese is chosen by direct election.

Notes

Timeline

References

Varese
 
Politics of Lombardy
Varese